Lahti sub-region  is a subdivision of Päijänne Tavastia and one of the Sub-regions of Finland since 2009.

Municipalities
Lahti area
 Asikkala (8,434)
 Hollola (22,080)
 Kärkölä (4,798)
 Lahti (103,352)
 Orimattila (16,352)
 Padasjoki (3,358)
Heinola area
 Hartola (3,209)
 Heinola (20,013)
 Sysmä (4,263)

Sub-regions of Finland
Geography of Päijät-Häme